North Face  is a 2008 German historical fiction film directed by Philipp Stölzl and starring Benno Fürmann, Florian Lukas, Johanna Wokalek, and Ulrich Tukur. Based on the famous 1936 attempt to climb the Eiger north face, the film is about two German climbers involved in a competition to climb the most dangerous rock face in the Alps.

Plot

In 1936, climbers attempt to summit the Eiger via the north face, the last major unclimbed Alpine face.

German climbers Toni Kurz (Fürmann) and Andi Hinterstoisser (Lukas) and novice journalist Louise (Wokalek) are childhood friends from Berchtesgaden, Bavaria. Toni and Louise are also romantically involved. The men enlisted in the army and are successful amateur climbers. After hearing of an attempt on the Eiger north face, they decide to compete to make the ascent. In spite of their false claims that one of them is getting married while the other is to be the best man, they are refused leave from the army. They quit the service, being more interested in mountaineering than politics. Meanwhile, the competing team of Austrians are hoping for a Nazi-led incorporation of Austria into Germany.

Louise's superiors at the newspaper see a media opportunity and send her and her editor, she serving as a photographer, to cover the pair's ascent. Having no funds, Kurz and Hinterstoisser travel to the Bernese Alps on bicycles and share a tent, while the reporter pair stay in the luxurious hotel at Kleine Scheidegg. Competing French and Italian climbers assess the conditions and decide to abort their attempt, leaving the German and Austrian teams. Once both pairs begin, others watch from below.

After a series of incidents, the teams are forced to join together to survive and descend to safety. A rescue team comes within metres of reaching the last climber, but a knot between two short ropes is unable to pass through his carabiner. Kurz dies within earshot of Louise. Distraught at losing her best friends and repelled by her editor's cynicism, Louise resigns. Later, she finds work as a professional photographer in postwar New York.

Cast

Production

Filming locations
 Austria
 Dachstein, Steiermark, Austria
 Graz, Styria, Austria
 Kleine Scheidegg, Kanton Bern, Switzerland
 Switzerland

Reception
Critical response
After a successful theatrical run in Germany, Switzerland, and Austria, the film was released in several non-German speaking countries including the United States, United Kingdom, Italy, and Japan from 2009-2010, receiving favorable reviews throughout. Some critics have argued that this is a brilliant metaphor for Germanic anti-Semitism.

Awards and nominations
 2009 German Film Award in Gold for Best Cinematography (Kolja Brandt)
 2009 German Film Award in Gold for Best Sound (Heinz Ebner, Guido Zettier, Christian Bischoff, Tschangis Chahrokh)
 2009 German Film Award in Gold Nomination for Best Production Design (Udo Kramer)
 2009 German Film Critics Award for Best Cinematography (Kolja Brandt)
 2009 German Film Critics Award for Best Screenplay (Philipp Stölzl, Christoph Silber, Rupert Henning, Johannes Naber)
 2009 Motion Picture Sound Editors Golden Reel Award Nomination for Best Sound Editing - Foreign Feature (Alexander Buck, Carsten Richter, Alexander Vitt, Guido Zettier, Tobias Poppe)

Historical elements of the plot
 German government publicity did draw attention to German and Austrian mountaineering, and to climbing the North Face in particular, as matters of German national and ethnic pride.
 The names and nationalities of the members of the historical single team of four who set out to attempt the ascent together correspond to those of the members of the two fictional teams.
 Like the fictional Andi and Toni, the historical Andreas Hinterstoisser and Toni Kurz did have a shared association with Berchtesgaden, having, two years before their deaths, established a route together on the Berchtesgadener Hochthron.
 The route of the historical team is essentially as portrayed in the film.
 The rope that Hinterstoisser placed on the Hinterstoisser Traverse, and was used by the others to cross, was removed before the last team member continued upward.
 When recovered, the corpse of one of the Austrian climbers showed he had been bandaged for a head wound.
 During the descent Andi did attempt to cross the area known as Hinterstoisser Traverse using the pendulum traverse, as he had the ascent, and gave up when he realised his efforts were futile. (Even though the scene in the movie is short, Andi tried for hours but to no avail)
 A rope supporting two climbers was cut
 to move forward with the attempt at rescue (rather than in crisis of the next seconds or few minutes),
 below the climber doing the cutting (rather by one of climbers dropping as a result),
 on instructions from the rescuers, and
 after the two appeared beyond communicating or helping in their own rescue.
 After the avalanche, Kurz:
 was the only team member with hope for survival,
 had lost a glove and found the corresponding arm stiff and useless,
 communicated with would-be rescuers at the tunnel "window",
 unravelled a rope using teeth and one hand over the course of five hours, producing a longer cord which he lowered so an additional rope could be tied to it and sent up for the rest of his descent,
 Anschluss between Germany and Austria had substantial public support in Austria, and was effected in 1938.

References

External links

North Face at Rotten Tomatoes

2008 films
2008 biographical drama films
2000s disaster films
2000s sports drama films
2000s survival films
Austrian biographical drama films
Austrian sports drama films
German disaster films
German biographical drama films
German sports drama films
Swiss biographical drama films
Biographical films about sportspeople
Mountaineering films
Films about death
Films about friendship
Films about Nazi Germany
Films directed by Philipp Stölzl
Films set in 1936
Films set in Switzerland
Films set in the Alps
Films shot in Switzerland
Films shot in Austria
Eiger
2008 drama films
2000s German films
2000s German-language films